La Longue marche is a 1966 French drama film directed by Alexandre Astruc, starring Robert Hossein, Jean-Louis Trintignant and Maurice Ronet. The narrative is set in 1944 within the French Resistance. Principal photography took place from 29 September to 13 November 1965. The film had 532,532 admissions in French cinemas.

Cast
 Robert Hossein as Carnot
 Jean-Louis Trintignant as Philippe
 Maurice Ronet as Chevallier
 Jean-Pierre Kalfon as Piton
 Berthe Grandval as the pharmacist's daughter
 Robert Dalban as the pharmacist
 Willy Braque as Robert
 Paul Frankeur as Morel

References

External links

1966 drama films
1966 films
Films about the French Resistance
Films directed by Alexandre Astruc
Films set in 1944
French drama films
1960s French-language films
1960s French films